Butayevo (Botay) is a rural locality (a selo) in Zigazinsky Selsoviet, Beloretsky District, Bashkortostan, Russia. The population was 100 as of 2010. There are 3 streets.

Geography 
Butayevo is located 95 km southwest of Beloretsk (the district's administrative centre) by road. Zigaza is the nearest rural locality.

References 

Rural localities in Beloretsky District